is an action-platform video game developed and published by Hudson Soft for the Famicom in 1985.

History
The game was originally planned as a port of the ZX Spectrum video game Stop the Express (later released for the Commodore 64 and MSX), which was released by Sinclair Research Ltd in 1983. Stop the Express only contained the first train level, and 3 levels were added for the release of Challenger. The game's title screen displays the slogan "Realtime Action Adventure."

The game is uniquely constructed, where the levels consist of a side-scrolling platform game, a top-view scrolling shooting game, and a fixed-screen action game. The game was also unique for its 100-screen map, which was extensive for its time. The game has been re-released as a mobile phone application, and was made available on the Nintendo Wii Virtual Console for 500 Wii Points in May, 2007 and the 3DS Virtual Console in March 2013. The game was also coupled with Milon's Secret Castle ( in Japan) and released for the Game Boy Advance as part of Hudson Best Collection Vol. 3 Action Collection compilation on December 22, 2005. A Mobile version was released in 2005 with several changes in gameplay.

Plot
The title character, Challenger, is an archaeologist who seeks to rescue the princess, Maria, from the hands of the evil boss, Don Waldorado, in the land called Pleasio Land. The setting of the character as an archaeologist is an homage to the Indiana Jones franchise, while his name may be an allusion to Conan Doyle's Professor Challenger (best known for his appearance in The Lost World).

The scene in the first level where the princess is taken away by the villain is programmed as part of the level, and it is impossible to catch up to the princess no matter how quickly the player progresses. The background music for this level is an arranged version of the well-known military march by Franz Schubert.

Gameplay
The player controls the main character, Challenger, and must head towards the goal in each level. The player can attack by throwing knives, but some enemies are invulnerable to this attack, and require a power-up item or the assistance of a hidden character to defeat. In levels 1, 3, and 4, touching any of the enemies results in a loss. The player can jump in the side-scrolling scenes, and can also duck by pressing down on the keypad in the first level. In most other games, the A button is used to jump, and the B button is used to attack, but in Challenger, the controls are reversed, where the A button causes the character to attack, and the B button causes them to jump. The player also falls off the train and loses if they throw a knife while they are on the connecting area between train cars.

A life gauge is used only during the second level. The player receives damage whenever they touch enemies, and loses only when their life gauge reaches zero. There is no jump button for the top-view level, but the player can venture across the island to search for items. A timer is displayed on the upper left corner of the screen during all of the levels, and the player also loses a life when this timer reaches zero. Falling off of very high places or getting caught in traps also results in a loss, and the player is taken to the game over screen when there are no lives remaining.

Difficulty
The player can also choose the game's difficulty from 16 different settings on the title screen. The number of enemies decreases for lower level settings. However, the player must defeat certain special enemies in order to gain items required to complete some levels, and the decreased number of enemies on the lower difficulty settings actually makes it more difficult to finish the game. Therefore, the lowest setting is not necessarily the easiest difficulty setting.

Levels

The first level (or "scene") is titled "STOP THE EXPRESS!". The villain, Don Waldorado, has abducted Princess Maria, and is escaping on a special express train. Challenger heads for the front train car while avoiding Waldorado's cronies, but Waldorado cuts off the connection between the rear train cars and escapes after pushing Challenger off the train.

The second level is titled "SEARCH PRINCESS!". The challenger arrives at Waldorado island in search of the princess, and ventures through an extensive 4-directional scrolling game map. Entering certain caves or buildings allows the player to advance to the third and fourth levels, but others may be dangerous trap zones which can cause instant death.

The third level is titled "GET KEYWORD!". The princess is now being held captive in a pyramid, and Challenger must gather the three keyword items (a key, a ring, and a crown) that are spread throughout the third level in order to enter the pyramid. The level takes place in the inside of a cave, where Challenger must use the gushing fountains of water as steps to cross over to the other side. There are several entrances to level 3 located on Waldorado island, so the player can head for the pyramid by going back and forth between the second and third levels.

The fourth and final level is titled "RESCUE PRINCESS!". Challenger arrives at the pyramid after collecting the three key items, and must jump across several dinosaur-shaped rocks to reach the top floor, where he will face Don Waldorado in the final battle. The player returns to the first level after the conclusion of the fourth level, and the game's difficulty increases by 2 settings.

Enemies

The main antagonist of the game is the leader of an evil secret organization called Bloody Whacker, and abducts Princess Maria in the first level. He is impossible to defeat in his first appearance on the express train (touching Waldorado on this level does not result in damage). Challenger must defeat him in the final showdown in level 4, where he can be defeated with four throwing knives.

These large bird-like enemies appear in all 4 levels, and can be killed with throwing knives. They appear on difficulty settings above 3 for levels 1, 2, and 4, and difficulty settings above 9 for level 3.

These enemies are small automobiles with propellers which appear in the first level. They travel alongside the train, and suddenly rise up into the air. They cannot be defeated by throwing knives, but only appear for difficulty settings above 9.

These enemies are thunder clouds which occasionally attack by transforming into lightning bolts. They are not affected by throwing knives, and the background music changes when they appear in level 1. They appear on difficulty settings above 3 for level 1, and difficulty settings above 9 for level 3. There is no animation for when these enemies are killed, so when the character touches them while invincible in the first level, they turn into the skeleton enemy before disappearing.

These bearded enemies appear in levels 1 and 2, and wear distinct green clothing. They can be killed with throwing knives, and appear for difficulty settings above 3 for both levels.

These enemies are fireballs that appear on all of the levels (but not on level 3 for difficulty settings below 2). They cannot be killed with throwing knives.

These rabbit-like enemies are fairies wearing helmets. They can be killed with throwing knives, and only appear on level 2 for difficulty settings above 3.

These enemies are yellow, roundish robots. They can be killed with throwing knives, and only appear on level 2 for difficulty settings above 3.

These enemies are shaped like animal skulls. They can be killed with throwing knives, and only appear on level 2 for difficulty settings above 3.

These enemies are walking plants that eat humans. They can be killed with throwing knives, and only appear on level 2 for difficulty settings above 3.

These skeletons appear in level 2, where they guard the entrances to the third and fourth levels by passing back and forth quickly in front of the entrance. They cannot be killed by throwing knives, and the player will lose a life regardless of their remaining health if they come in contact with them. However, it is possible to avoid them by slipping into the entrance at the right timing. They only appear for difficulty settings above 3.

Items, objects, and traps

Challenger's life gauge refills while they appear on screen, and they can also be killed off with the throwing knife for 400 bonus points (they are resurrected if the player scrolls away from the area). They are treated as enemy characters in the game's memory, and count towards the kill count needed to obtain the power sword and power jewel items. For difficulty settings below 2, the only enemies that appear on level 2 are the invincible fireballs, so the only way to obtain the items are to continue killing the whales. A hovering whale can also appear in level 2, and killing this whale awards the player an extra life. Killing the hovering whale in level 1 causes Challenger to become invincible.

Power-up items
A power sword or power jewel appears in level 2 if the player kills 4 enemies in a row without missing with a knife shot. Challenger can obtain the item by hitting it with a knife, but he will receive damage if he comes in direct contact with the item. Obtaining the power sword causes Challenger's sprite color to change for a short period of time, during which his walking speed increases, and he gains the ability to kill any of the enemies on the screen with his throwing knives. Obtaining the power jewel causes all of the enemies on the screen to die instantaneously. The skeleton enemy that guards the entrances to levels 3 and 4 is impervious to throwing knives, so either one of the power-up items must be obtained in order to advance to the next levels. Like the Mattōkujira, the power-up items also cause the player's life gauge to refill as long as they remain visible on screen.

Mystery zone
This trap area is a small, square-shaped zone with four holes. Stepping into any of the holes results in an instant loss. The background music changes when the player enters this area, and they can only escape using the power sword item.

The name of this trap area is the romanized Japanese word for the antlion. The trap area has a large vortex pattern on the floor, which drags the player towards the center. Falling into the center hole results in a loss of one life. The background music changes when the player enters this area, and they can only escape using the power sword item.

Trap island
A fake pyramid is located on this island. Entering the fake pyramid results in a loss of one life.

Mobile version
An i-appli mobile application version of Challenger was released on August 1, 2005 for cellphones supporting i-appli in Japan. The game is currently available on the EZweb network as well. There are two modes in the mobile version; a classic mode, which is identical to the Famicom version of the game, and the arranged mode, which features improved graphics and character design along with several changes in gameplay. The changes from the classic mode to the arranged version are as follows:

The difficulty settings were decreased from 16 settings to 3 settings.
Conversation scenes are shown between characters in-between levels.
Challenger has a life gauge for all of the levels, meaning he cannot die from a single hit from an enemy.
The level 2 game map was completely remade, and the player may view the map in the game's sub menu.
Challenger can move in the diagonal direction for the top-view second level, and Challenger can throw knives while jumping in the three other levels. The jump-throw motion is required to defeat the arranged version's Waldorado.
Waldorado is tougher and sports several new attack patterns in the arranged version. Hitting Waldorado several times causes him to change color and fly, and the player must throw knives while jumping in order to hit the flying Waldorado.
An ending screen is added instead of the level-cycle loop of the classic version.
A save option was added to both the arranged version and classic version.

Notes

References

External links
Virtual Console official website

1985 video games
Game Boy Advance games
Hudson Soft games
Japan-exclusive video games
Mobile games
Nintendo Entertainment System games
Platform games
Side-scrolling video games
Video games developed in Japan
Video games scored by Takeaki Kunimoto
Virtual Console games
Single-player video games